is a Japanese football player who plays for Hokkaido Consadole Sapporo.

Playing career
Although considered short for a goalkeeper, standing at 178 cm, he makes up for his lack of height with superb agility and reflexes. In 2006, he was part of the Yokohama FC defense that set a J.League record when they did not concede a goal for 770 consecutive minutes, breaking Shimizu S-Pulse's 731 minutes recorded in 1993. They also kept 7 consecutive clean sheets (which was also a tied J2 League record) en route to promotion to the J1 League. In 2007 Sugeno was named J.league rookie of the year. In 2008, he was signed by Kashiwa Reysol, a move which some consider unwise as Kashiwa already have a good and relatively young goalkeeper in Yuta Minami.

Club statistics

Honours
Kashiwa Reysol
 J1 League: 2011
 J2 League: 2010
 Emperor's Cup: 2012
 J.League Cup: 2013 
 Japanese Super Cup: 2012

Yokohama
 J2 League: 2006

Individual Honors
 J.League Rookie of the Year: 2007

References

External links

Profile at Kashiwa Reysol

1984 births
Living people
Association football people from Saitama Prefecture
Japanese footballers
J1 League players
J2 League players
Yokohama FC players
Kashiwa Reysol players
Kyoto Sanga FC players
Hokkaido Consadole Sapporo players
Association football goalkeepers